Rage of the Buccaneers, also known as Pirate Warrior, is a 1961 Italian epic adventure film  directed  by Mario Costa and starring Ricardo Montalbán and Vincent Price.

Plot

Cast 
 
Ricardo Montalbán as Captain Gordon 
Vincent Price as  Romero
Giulia Rubini as  Manuela 
Liana Orfei as  Luanal
Mario Feliciani as  Governor
Giustino Durano as Juan
 Gisella Sofio as  Rosita 
José Jaspe as  Captain Tortuga
Edoardo Toniolo as  Felipe Cortez
 Gino Marturano as  Tarto
 Andrea Fantasia as  Bonifacio
Franco Fantasia as Official

References

External links

1960s historical adventure films
Italian historical adventure films
Italian swashbuckler films
1960s Italian-language films
English-language Italian films
1960s English-language films
Films directed by Mario Costa
Films scored by Carlo Rustichelli
Pirate films
Films set in the 17th century
1960s multilingual films
Italian multilingual films
1960s Italian films